Psalm Adjeteyfio, also known as T.T. (1948 - 8 April 2022), was a Ghanaian actor who featured in movies and videos.

Born in Ghana, then known as Gold Coast, he was best known for the lead character T.T in the Ghanaian TV series Taxi Driver.

Before he got into acting, he was a Ga language teacher at the PRESEC staff school.

Filmography
 The Chosen One
 Ultimate Paradise Taxi Driver A Stab In The Dark James Town Fisherman Expectations My Heart Dark Sand Asimo''
 Happy Little Children
 American Boy

Death
Adjeteyfio died at the age of 74 after a heart attack on April 8, 2022.

References

External links

1948 births
2022 deaths
Ghanaian male film actors
Ghanaian male television actors
20th-century Ghanaian male actors
21st-century Ghanaian male actors